is an underground metro station located in Atsuta-ku, Nagoya, Aichi Prefecture, Japan operated by the Nagoya Municipal Subway's Meikō Line. It is located 1.5 kilometers from the terminus of the Meikō Line at Kanayama Station. This station provides access to Nagoya Congress Center.

History
Hibino Station was opened on 29 March 1971.

Lines

 (Station E02)

Layout
Hibino Station has a single underground island platform.

Platforms

The station has two tracks and, unusually for this line, one physical platform, which is divided into Platform 1 for Nagoyakō Station, and Platform 2 for Kanayama Station.  There is one wicket, beyond which are five exits.  On Platform 1 to Nagoya Port, train door 13 is closest to the elevator, doors 13 and 9 are closest to the escalators, and door 16 is closest to the stairs.  On Platform 2, door 5 is closest to the elevator and escalator and door 2 is closest to the stairs.  There are public phones near the elevators on the platforms, near the wicket, and near Exit 4.  There is a handicapped-accessible bathroom with a baby changing area, and a second baby changing area, outside wicket.  The station has coin lockers.  There is a minor bus rotary outside the station.

References

External links

 Hibino Station's web page at the Nagoya Transportation Bureau's web site 
 Nagoya Wholesale Fish Market 

Atsuta-ku, Nagoya
Railway stations in Japan opened in 1971
Railway stations in Nagoya
Stations of Nagoya Municipal Subway